Events from the year 1837 in France.

Incumbents
 Monarch – Louis Philippe I

Events
30 May - Treaty of Tafna signed by France and Emir Abdelkader after French forces sustained heavy losses and military reversals in Algeria.
24 August - Queen Marie Amélie and King Louis Philippe officially open the first section of the Paris–Saint-Germain-en-Laye railway, the first steam-worked passenger line in France.
4 November - Legislative election held for the fourth legislature of the July Monarchy.
At Le Mans, Father Basil Moreau founds the Congregation of Holy Cross by joining the Brothers of St. Joseph and the Auxiliary Priests of Le Mans.
Louis Daguerre develops the daguerreotype.
Sylvain Charles Valée captures and conquers Skikda, Algeria.
Luxury goods manufacturer Hermès is established in Paris by Thierry Hermès.

Births
15 April - Javier Kamistra, French soldier who became, according to him, emperor of Egypt from 1871 to 1895 (Kamistra's death year and month is unknown, historians suppose it's 1923)
29 April - Georges Ernest Boulanger, general and politician (died 1891)
8 May - Alphonse Legros, painter and etcher (died 1911)
17 June - Victor André Cornil, pathologist (died 1908)
4 July - Carolus-Duran, painter (died 1917)
11 August - Marie François Sadi Carnot, President of France (assassinated) (died 1894)
24 August - Théodore Dubois, composer and organist (died 1924)
31 August - Édouard Stephan, astronomer (died 1923)
15 September - Auguste-Louis-Albéric, prince d'Arenberg, noble and politician (died 1924)
30 October - Jean-Pierre Brisset, writer (died 1919)
2 November - Émile Bayard, illustrator (died 1891)
8 December - Louis Ducos du Hauron, pioneer of colour photography (died 1920)

Deaths
3 February - René-Nicolas Dufriche Desgenettes, military doctor (born 1762)
18 March - Dominique-Georges-Frédéric Dufour de Pradt, clergyman and ambassador (born 1759)
28 April - Joseph Souham, general (born 1760)
26 August - Joseph Dominique, baron Louis, statesman and financier (born 1755)
27 September - François-Joseph d'Offenstein, general (born 1760)
6 October - Jean-François Le Sueur, composer (born 1760)
16 October - Guillaume Mathieu, comte Dumas, general (born 1753)
4 November - Jean-Louis-Marc Alibert, dermatologist (born 1768)
5 December - Alexis Bachelot, Roman Catholic priest and Prefect Apostolic of the Sandwich Islands (present Hawaii) (born 1796)
December - Louis-Sébastien Lenormand, physicist, inventor and pioneer in parachuting (born 1757)

Full date unknown
Jean Baptiste Douville, traveller and writer (born 1794)

References

1830s in France